Hugh Pierce Roberts (14 October 1882 – 5 December 1969) was a Welsh professional football outside right, best remembered for his four years in the Football League with Leeds City.

Personal life 
Roberts' had a wife and four children and his brothers Albert and Dick were also footballers. Roberts served as a private in the Middlesex Regiment's Football Battalion during the First World War, but he was unable to return to football after sustaining a fractured ankle in an accident in France in September 1918.

Career statistics

References

Welsh footballers
English Football League players
Association football outside forwards
British Army personnel of World War I
Middlesex Regiment soldiers
Southport F.C. players
Leeds City F.C. players
Southern Football League players
Scunthorpe United F.C. players
Luton Town F.C. players
1882 births
Sportspeople from Rhyl
1969 deaths